Francis Tebbs Havergal (1829–1890), author and editor.

The youngest son of William Henry Havergal was born 27 Aug. 1829. He was a bible-clerk of New College, Oxford (B.A. 1852, M.A. 1857); he became vicar-choral in Hereford Cathedral, 1853–1874, vicar of Pipe and Lyde, 1861–74, and of Upton Bishop, 1874–90, and prebendary of Hereford, 1877–90.

He died at Upton on 27 July 1890.

Publications
The Visitor's Hand Guide to Hereford Cathedral, 1869; 6th ed. 1882. 
Fasti Herefordenses, 1869. 
Monumental Inscriptions in Hereford Cathedral, 1881. 
Records of Upton Bishop, 1883. 
Herefordshire Words and Phrases, 1887. 
Memorials of the Rev. Sir Frederick Arthur Gore Ouseley, Baronet, 1889.

1829 births
1890 deaths
19th-century English Anglican priests
English non-fiction writers
People from Hereford
Alumni of New College, Oxford
English male non-fiction writers